World Victory Road Presents: Sengoku 9 was a mixed martial arts event promoted by World Victory Road on August 2, 2009. It featured the final round of WVR's 2009 Featherweight Grand-Prix.  This event was broadcast in North America via tape delay on HDNet.

Results

2009 Featherweight Grand Prix Bracket

Note: Hioki was unable to continue due to a concussion and was replaced by Kanehara.

Featherweight Grand Prix Reserve Bouts:
 Jung Chan Sung def.  Matt Jaggers at Sengoku 9

See also
 World Victory Road
 List of Sengoku champions
 2009 in World Victory Road

References

World Victory Road events
2009 in mixed martial arts